Dugald MacFarlane (1869–1956) was a Scottish minister who served as Moderator of the General Assembly of the Church of Scotland in 1937.

Life

He was born in Tobermory on 10 July 1869 the youngest of seven children to Catherine (née McLachlan, born 1825) and Rev Duncan MacFarlane (1822–1908). His father was originally from Tiree and moved to Tobermory as a merchant, before becoming a Baptist minister in 1856. In 1879 he succeeded his brother, John MacFarlane, as minister of Tiree Baptist Church.

Dugald was brought up bilingual in both Gaelic and English from childhood. He was educated at the Royal High School, Edinburgh, then studied divinity at the University of Edinburgh. He was licensed to preach in 1895, and his first post was as assistant at St John's Church in Edinburgh.

He was ordained as a Church of Scotland minister in Glencoe and in 1902 translated to Arrochar before moving to Kingussie in 1906, where he settled for the rest of his life, conducting services at St Columba's church in Pont-street. In May 1937 he succeeded Very Rev Daniel Lamont as moderator.

He died in Kingussie on 8 October 1956, and is buried in Kingussie Parish Churchyard.

Family

In 1902 he married Roma Constance Campbell (1870–1947). They had two daughters.

References

1869 births
1956 deaths
Alumni of the University of Edinburgh
20th-century Ministers of the Church of Scotland
Moderators of the General Assembly of the Church of Scotland